Peter Abraham Haskell (October 15, 1934 – April 12, 2010) was an American actor who worked primarily in television.

Early years
Haskell was born in Boston, Massachusetts, the son of Rose (née Golden) and geophysicist Norman Haskell. 

He attended Browne & Nichols and later earned a Bachelor of Arts degree at Harvard University following a two-year stint in the United States Army where he rose to the rank of Private First Class.

Career
Haskell's plan to study at Columbia Law School was derailed when he was cast in the off-Broadway play The Love Nest, with James Earl Jones and Sally Kirkland. The play closed after only 13 performances but led to his being cast in an episode of Death Valley Days.

Guest appearances followed on The Outer Limits, Twelve O'Clock High,  Dr. Kildare, Combat!, The Man from U.N.C.L.E., Ben Casey, The Fugitive, The F.B.I. The Mary Tyler Moore Show, The Big Valley, Mannix, Medical Center, The Streets of San Francisco, Barnaby Jones, Cannon, Vega$, B. J. and the Bear, Charlie's Angels, The A-Team, Hunter, Matlock, and Booker. He was a regular on the soap operas Search for Tomorrow and Ryan's Hope, and the primetime series Bracken's World. He had recurring roles in Garrison's Gorillas and Rich Man, Poor Man Book II, and was featured in TV movies, such as The Eyes of Charles Sand (1972), The Phantom of Hollywood (1974), The Night They Took Miss Beautiful (1977), Superdome (1978), Mandrake (1979) and The Cracker Factory (1979).

His film appearances include the title role in The Legend of Earl Durand (1974), Riding the Edge (1989) and Robot Wars (1993), though he is best known for playing Mr. Sullivan, the CEO of Playpals Toys, in  David Kirschner's Child's Play 2 (1990) and Child's Play 3 (1991). Other TV roles in the 1990s included Matlock, Frasier, Columbo: Caution: Murder Can Be Hazardous to Your Health, JAG, The Closer, MacGyver, Murder She Wrote, and Cold Case.

Personal life

Haskell was married to Annie Compton from 1960 until their 1974 divorce. In 1974, he married Dianne Tolmich.

Haskell was an Episcopalian and a lifelong liberal Democrat.

His daughter Audra announced his death the day it occurred, but did not specify the cause. Upon his death, he was cremated.

Filmography

References

External links

 
 

1934 births
2010 deaths
American male film actors
American male soap opera actors
American male television actors
Harvard University alumni
Male actors from Boston
20th-century American male actors
21st-century American male actors
Buckingham Browne & Nichols School alumni
California Democrats
Massachusetts Democrats
20th-century American Episcopalians
21st-century American Episcopalians